Sofiane Bengorine or Bengoreine (born 10 October 1984 in Sidi Bel Abbès) is an Algerian former professional footballer who played as a defender.

Honours
USM Bel Abbès
 Algerian Cup: 2018

References

1984 births
Living people
Algerian footballers
Association football defenders
MC Oran players
People from Sidi Bel Abbès
USM Bel Abbès players
ASM Oran players
JS Kabylie players
ES Sétif players
USM Annaba players
21st-century Algerian people